An Kum-ae (born 3 June 1980) is a North Korean judoka.

Biography
In the 2012 Summer Olympics, An won the gold medal in the Women's 52 kg Judo competition after defeating Yanet Bermoy of Cuba, having won the silver medal at the 2008 Summer Olympics, losing to Xian Dongmei of China in the gold medal match.

An won a bronze medal in the half-lightweight category (52 kg) at the 2005 World Judo Championships, having defeated Lyudmila Bogdanova of Russia in the bronze medal match.  She again won the bronze medal at the 2007 World Judo Championships.

An won the gold medal in the same weight category at the 2006 Asian Games, having defeated Mönkhbaataryn Bundmaa of Mongolia in the final match.

An currently resides in the North Korean capital city Pyongyang.

References

External links
 
 
 
 2006 Asian Games profile

1980 births
Living people
North Korean female judoka
Judoka at the 2008 Summer Olympics
Judoka at the 2012 Summer Olympics
Olympic judoka of North Korea
Olympic silver medalists for North Korea
Olympic medalists in judo
Asian Games medalists in judo
Olympic gold medalists for North Korea
Sportspeople from Pyongyang
Medalists at the 2012 Summer Olympics
Medalists at the 2008 Summer Olympics
Judoka at the 2006 Asian Games
Judoka at the 2010 Asian Games
Asian Games gold medalists for North Korea
Asian Games bronze medalists for North Korea
Medalists at the 2006 Asian Games
Medalists at the 2010 Asian Games
Universiade medalists in judo
Universiade bronze medalists for North Korea
Medalists at the 2001 Summer Universiade